Phalaris aquatica, known by the common names bulbous canary-grass and Harding grass, is a species of grass in the genus Phalaris of the family Poaceae.

Description
It is an erect, waist-high, stout perennial bunch grass, with grayish to bluish green leaves. It is slow to develop from seed, but can form large bunches after several years.

Phalaris arundinacea (reed canary grass) differs from Harding grass in having more distinct rhizomes, and an inflorescence that is compact at first but becomes more open as the branches spread.

Hybrids of Harding grass and reed canary grass have been produced.  Varieties include 'AQ1', 'Uneta', and 'Australis'.

P. aquatica is a quick-growing grass which incorporates and utilises soil nitrogen rapidly.

Geography
Phalaris aquatica originated from Southern Europe and the Caucasus. It is naturalized in South Africa, Australia, New Zealand and the USA. Although very recently introduced there, its pasture value was first recognised in Australia. Domesticated cultivation then spread to the United States, Argentina and several other countries in South America, and New Zealand.

Chemical constituents
Leaves and seedlings contain gramine.

Forage
Phalaris aquatica is a pasture species grazed by ruminants. The grass can also be cut, providing good quality fodder for grazing livestock for 8 to 12 months a year.

Toxicity
Some Phalaris species contain gramine, which can cause brain damage, other organ damage, central nervous system damage and death in sheep, although Phalaris aquatica is said to be non-toxic to them.

In Victoria, Australia, it is reported that kangaroos grazing on Phalaris aquatica may develop a condition known familiarly as "Phalaris staggers", in which coordination and mobility are affected.

Invasive species
Harding grass is an invasive species in grassland, oak woodland, chaparral, and riparian habitats. Native grasses and grassland habitat in California are affected.

References

External links
 Jepson Manual Treatment

Forages
aquatica
Psychedelic tryptamine carriers
Taxa named by Carl Linnaeus
Flora of Malta